Gareth Jones may refer to:

Academics
Gareth Jones (lawyer) (1930–2016), British law professor, "founding father" of the English law of restitution
W. Gareth Jones (born 1936), Welsh academic and translator
Gareth Stedman Jones (born 1942), British historian
Gareth Jones (researcher), British professor of information technology
Gareth Jones (academic), British professor of urban geography

Arts and entertainment
Gareth Jones (actor) (1925–1958), British actor
Gareth Jones (director) (born 1951), British film and television director and screenwriter
Gareth Jones (music producer) (born 1954), English music producer and engineer
Gareth Jones (conductor) (born 1960), Welsh conductor of the Welsh National Opera chorus
Gareth Jones (presenter) (born 1961), Welsh television presenter
Gareth P. Jones (fl. 2006–present), British children's author
Gareth Jones (EastEnders), fictional television character better known as Andy Flynn
Gareth Jones (People in Planes) (fl. 1990s–2010s), Welsh singer and guitarist of the band People in Planes

Others
Gareth Jones (journalist) (1905–1935), Welsh journalist
Gareth Jones (politician) (born 1939), Welsh politician, member of the National Assembly for Wales
Gareth Bryan-Jones (born 1943), British Olympic middle-distance runner
Gareth Jones (rugby union) (1979–2008), Welsh rugby union player

Other uses
Gareth Jones (film)

See also
Gary Jones (disambiguation)